The following highways are numbered 816:

Costa Rica
 National Route 816

Finland
 National Highway 816 (Finland)

United States